Otis Whitfield Douglas Jr. (July 25, 1911 – March 21, 1989) was an American gridiron football player and coach.  He served as the head football coach at the University of Akron (1941–1942), Drexel University (1949), and the University of Arkansas (1950–1952), compiling a career college football coaching record of 17–34–4.  He also  coached the Calgary Stampeders of the Canadian Football League (CFL) from 1955 to 1960. 

After World War II, Douglas played for the Philadelphia Eagles of the National Football League (NFL) for four seasons (1946–1949.)  In 1946, he became the oldest NFL rookie of all time, at 35 years of age.

Born in Reedville, Virginia, Douglas played college football at the College of William & Mary in 1929 and 1930.  He served in United States Navy from 1942 to 1945.  Douglas worked as an assistant coach Villanova University under Frank Reagan in 1954.  He was an assistant coach for the Baltimore Colts in 1953 and was a consultant to the coaching staff of the Cincinnati Reds of Major League Baseball in 1961 and 1962, assisting with physical fitness and morale.

In 1979, Douglas was inducted into the Virginia Sports Hall of Fame.

Head coaching record

College

References

External links
 
 

1911 births
1989 deaths
American football tackles
Akron Zips football coaches
Arkansas Razorbacks football coaches
Baltimore Colts coaches
Cincinnati Reds coaches
Drexel Dragons football coaches
Philadelphia Eagles players
Villanova Wildcats football coaches
William & Mary Tribe football coaches
William & Mary Tribe football players
United States Navy personnel of World War II
People from Reedville, Virginia
Coaches of American football from Virginia
Players of American football from Virginia